The 1942 season was the thirty-first season for Santos FC.

References

External links
Official Site 

Santos
1942
1942 in Brazilian football